Huangjia may refer to the following locations in China:

 Huangjia, Anhui (黄甲镇), town in Tongcheng
 Huangjia, Shandong (黄夹镇), town in Laoling